Borealin is a protein that in humans is encoded by the CDCA8 gene.

Function 

CDCA8 is a component of a chromosomal passenger complex required for stability of the bipolar mitotic spindle.

Interactions 

CDCA8 has been shown to interact with INCENP, Survivin and Aurora B kinase.

References

Further reading

External links